The 2016 AFC Cup qualifying play-off was played on 9 February 2016. A total of eight teams competed in the qualifying play-off to decide four of the 32 places in the group stage of the 2016 AFC Cup.

Teams
The following eight teams (all from West Zone) entered the qualifying play-off, which consisted of one round only (play-off round):

No qualifying play-off was held in the East Zone due to lack of teams (all teams directly entered the group stage).

Format

In the qualifying play-off, each tie was played as a single match. Extra time and penalty shoot-out were used to decide the winner if necessary (Regulations Article 10.2). The four winners of the play-off round advanced to the group stage to join the 28 direct entrants.

Schedule
The schedule of each round was as follows.

Bracket

The bracket of the qualifying play-off was determined by the AFC based on the association ranking of each team, with the team from the higher-ranked association hosting each match.

Play-off 1
Al-Hidd advanced to Group A.

Play-off 2
Tripoli advanced to Group B.

Play-off 3
Al-Wahda advanced to Group C.

Play-off 4
Ahli Al-Khaleel advanced to Group D.

Play-off round

|-
!colspan=3|West Zone

|}

Notes

References

External links
AFC Cup, the-AFC.com

1